Escallonia rubra, called redclaws and red escallonia, is a species in the family Escalloniaceae which is native to southern Chile and neighboring areas of Argentina.

Description

Escallonia rubra is a spreading shrub usually 0.8 to 1.0m tall, but can reach a height of 3.6m. It features glossy, elliptical, serrate evergreen leaves. The upper side is glossy and dark green, while the lower side is much lighter. The bark is first red and rough-haired, which later turns brown and dotted, and eventually gray and cracked. The buds are scattered and oval with finely serrated edge on the outer half. The root system is stringy and somewhat weak in the first years. Later, strong main roots are formed, which lie high in the ground.

The pink to crimson trumpet-shaped flowers bloom in July to October in the Northern Hemisphere. The prominent, maroon to red hypanthia are campanulate with acute apices, leading to the common name redclaws. The flowers sit in short clusters from the leaf corners. The petals are fused into a short tube. The fruits are capsules.

Occurrence
The shrub occurs on the slopes of the Andes Mountains in southern Chile and Argentina all the way down to Tierra del Fuego, where it grows in scrub and open forest, among other biomes.

Cultivation
Cultivated as a garden and hedging plant, it has become naturalized in western Europe, Oregon in the United States, and New Zealand, and is considered invasive in places. It is grown in many other areas, such as Australia. Its cultivar 'Crimson Spire' has gained the Royal Horticultural Society's Award of Garden Merit.

Varieties
A number of varieties have been described, some of which may still be accepted, depending on the authority.
E. rubra var. albiflora Hosseus
E. rubra var. albiflora Poepp. & Endl.
E. rubra var. dumetorum (Phil.) Acevedo & Kausel
E. rubra var. glutinosa Reiche
E. rubra var. macrantha Reiche
E. rubra var. thalassica Kausel

References

rubra
Flora of southern South America
Plants described in 1805